Dioscurides or Dioskourides was a nephew of Antigonus I Monophthalmus and admiral during the Wars of the Diadochi.

Very little is known about him. He was possibly the brother of another nephew of Antigonus, Polemaios, son of Polemaios. Dioscurides is first mentioned in the history of Diodorus of Sicily in 314 BC, when he led 80 ships from the Hellespont and Rhodes to assist Antigonus during his siege of Tyre. This possibly indicates that he had been put by his uncle in charge of raising ships in these areas. Antigonus then sent him with a fleet of 190 ships to the Aegean Sea, with the task of getting the local islands to switch their support to Antigonus. Dioscurides was apparently successful in this mission, and this event is generally considered by modern scholars to mark the establishment of the Nesiotic League. 

In late 313 BC, Dioscurides led an Antigonid fleet in defending Lemnos from the Athenians, who had been encouraged to attack the island by Antigonus' rival, Cassander. Nothing further is known of him thereafter. According to Antigonus' biographer Richard Billows, this may be because Dioscurides died young, or because he later participated in Polemaios' unsuccessful rebellion against Antigonus.

References

Sources
 

4th-century BC Macedonians
Ancient Macedonian admirals
generals of Antigonus I Monophthalmus